Mohamad Taufik bin Suparno (born 31 October 1995) is a Singaporean professional footballer who plays as a forward for Singapore Premier League club Tampines Rovers and the Singapore national team.

Club career

Tampines Rovers

Taufik began his club career with S.League club Tampines Rovers in 2014. However, he made only one appearance for the club.

Young Lions
In 2015, Taufik signed for Young Lions and extended his contract up to 2018 when he rejoined his first club Tampines .

Back to Tampines 
The 2021 Singapore Premier League season saw Taufik appearing in 21 matches but only made the starting line-up thrice and scored on six occasions. 

Taufik enjoyed a superb start to the 2022 SPL season, scoring 3 goals in his first 3 appearances, earning a call-up to the Singapore national football team. Taufik ended the 2022 season as the 3rd highest local goalscorer with 12 goals in 27 games for the stags.

International career
Taufik was first called up to the national senior team in 2015 by head coach Bernd Stange for the 2018 FIFA World Cup qualification(AFC) matches against Japan and Syria on 12 and 17 October 2015 respectively. However, Taufik did not get a chance to make his international debut for both matches.

Taufik made his full debut for the Lions on 26 March 2022, in a 2-1 win against Malaysia at the 2022 FAS Tri-Nations Series.

Others

Singapore Selection Squad
He was selected as part of the Singapore Selection squad for The Sultan of Selangor's Cup to be held on 6 May 2017.

Career statistics

Club
. Caps and goals may not be correct. Career caps and goals does not include 2016 S.League statistics.

 Young Lions are ineligible for qualification to AFC competitions in their respective leagues.

International

References

External links

Singaporean footballers
Living people
1995 births
Young Lions FC players
Tampines Rovers FC players
Singaporean people of Indonesian descent
Association football forwards
Competitors at the 2017 Southeast Asian Games
Southeast Asian Games competitors for Singapore